André François (9 November 1915 – 11 April 2005), born André Farkas, was a Hungarian-born French cartoonist.

Life

He was born in Temesvár, Austria-Hungary (now Timișoara, Romania), He studied at the Academy of Fine Arts in Budapest (1932–33). He moved to Paris in 1934 and entered to the atelier of the famous poster artist Adolphe Cassandre (1935–36). He became a French citizen in 1939.

He worked as a painter, sculptor and graphic designer, but is best remembered for his cartoons, whose subtle humor and wide influence bear comparison to those of Saul Steinberg. François initially worked for French leftist newspapers (Le Nouvel Observateur) and illustrated books by authors such as Jacques Prévert, but gradually reached a larger audience, publishing in leading magazines of the United Kingdom (Punch) and the United States (The New Yorker). He also did a masterpiece cover illustration of the 1965 UK Penguin paperback edition of Lord of the Flies. He became a close friend and collaborator of Ronald Searle. He was member of Alliance Graphique Internationale.

He died in his home in Grisy-les-Plâtres, in the Val-d'Oise département.

Publications
 Les Larmes de Crocodile = Crocodile Tears. 
 Neuf No. 9. Paris: Maison de la Médecine, 1953. .
 The Tattooed Sailor. (Introduction by Walt Kelly.) New York: Alfred Knopf. 1953. 
 Paris: Delpire, 1955. .
 Crocodile Tears. London: Faber and Faber, 1955. . Translated by E.M. Hatt.
Double Bedside Book

Exhibition
2009: Rencontres d'Arles festival

See also
Musée Tomi Ungerer/Centre international de l'illustration

References
Anne-Claude Lelieur et Raymond Bachollet, André François, Bibliothèque Forney, 2003, 
Shahn, Ben, "The Gallic Laughter of Andre Francois," Horizon, May 1959, Volume I, Number 5, pp 108–121, (American Horizon, Inc., a subsidiary of American Heritage Publishing Co., Inc.)

External links
Obituary in The Times
André François at Pbase
André François at AskArt
 André François's 2004 exhibition at the Centre Pompidou
 "Timişoreanul André François, un caricaturist celebru", in Evenimentul Zilei
Art Directors Club biography, portrait and images of work

1915 births
2005 deaths
Artists from Timișoara
Hungarian emigrants to France
French cartoonists
Hungarian cartoonists
20th-century French painters
20th-century French male artists
French male painters
Hungarian painters
Hungarian sculptors
20th-century French sculptors
French male sculptors